KCKS may refer to:

 Kansas City, Kansas, a core city of the Kansas City metropolitan area.
 KCKS-LD, a low-power television station (channel 19, virtual 25) licensed to serve Kansas City, Kansas, United States
 KEGE (FM), a radio station (101.7 FM) licensed to serve Hamilton City, California, United States, which held the call sign KCKS from 2011 to 2013